1953 in Korea may refer to:
1953 in North Korea
1953 in South Korea